Motown & More is the eighteenth overall and thirteenth North American album released by the a cappella group Rockapella. Just like the live show it accompanies, the album consists of covers of classic Motown covers. This marked the final album that members John K. Brown, George Baldi III, and Steven Dorian can be heard on as they all left the band in 2013, 2015, and 2016, respectively.

Announcement, publicity, and release
It was hinted through a post by the official Rockapella Facebook page made on May 31, 2012 that a new album would be released in the fall to go along with the new show the group planned to start in September 2012 entitled "Motown & More". The album was not released, however, and news was scarce until February 28, 2013 when the track list and estimated released date of March 11–15 was posted by the group's Facebook page. On March 10, a track preview video was uploaded to Rockapella's official YouTube channel, and the album was released on iTunes five days later on March 15, with physical CDs to follow.

Track listing

Personnel
Scott Leonard – high tenor
Steven Dorian – tenor
John K. Brown – tenor
George Baldi III – bass
Jeff Thacher – vocal percussion

References

2013 albums
Rockapella albums